The Bundespräsidialamt (Office of the Federal President) is a federal agency (German: "oberste Bundesbehörde") of the Government of Germany assisting the President of Germany.

The office building is situated beneath Bellevue Palace in Tiergarten in Berlin. The seat was formerly in Bonn in the Villa Hammerschmidt and switched to Berlin with the Berlin-Bonn Act. The agency moved into the actual building in 1998.

The current head of the Bundespräsidialamt is State Secretary Dörte Dinger.

References

External links
 Bundespräsidialamt 

German federal agencies